Spokey Dokeys (sometimes Spokey Dokies, Spokey Dokes, or known generically as spoke beads) are a bicycle accessory, originating in the 1980s, most popular with children.  They are plastic beads that attach onto bicycle wheel spokes.

When the bicycle user pedals at a slow speed, the beads slide up and down the spoke, resulting in noise. When speed is increased the beads move to the outside of the rim due to centripetal force and cease to make sound. They come in a variety of colors, including glow in the dark and a variety of shapes include spheres and stars.

The idea was created by a California man, Larry Harmen. He was able to  develop the prototypes and then license it to a toy company.

References

Bicycle wheels